Penn State Nittany Lions women's ice hockey is a college ice hockey program that has represented Penn State University in National Collegiate Athletic Association (NCAA) Division I and College Hockey America (CHA) since the 2012–13 season. The program was preceded by a club team that competed at the American Collegiate Hockey Association (ACHA) Division 1 level, primarily as a member of Eastern Collegiate Women's Hockey League (ECWHL). Penn State plays its home games at Pegula Ice Arena in University Park, Pennsylvania.

History

ACHA years

Penn State's first women's hockey team – a club team called the "Lady Icers" – began play in the 1996–97 season, after students Ellen Bradley and Kathy Beckford recruited players from around campus and Vinnie Scalamogna, the assistant manager of the Penn State Ice Pavilion (then the university's sole ice facility), as coach. The Lady Icers' first game, a 5–4 win over the Susquehanna Rockettes (an adult club team), took place on February 1, 1997. The team was intermittently successful over its 16 years of existence, winning six conference regular season or playoff titles and qualifying for the ACHA National Tournament six times, peaking with a third-place finish at the end of the 2001-02 season.

Penn State concluded its time in the ACHA in February 2012, with eventual NCAA leader Josh Brandwene as head coach. That season, the Lady Icers played a mixed schedule, featuring ACHA and ECWHL opponents as well as eleven games against NCAA Division I and Division III teams. PSU finished the year by claiming the ECWHL regular season title, but then losing to Rhode Island in the league's playoff championship game.

Move to NCAA

After years of speculation the program transitioned to the NCAA Division I level along with the PSU men's ice hockey team for the 2012–13 season. The move was made possible thanks to a Penn State-record $88 million (later increased to $102 million) donation, announced on September 17, 2010, from Terrence Pegula, a Penn State alumnus and billionaire hockey fan, and his wife Kim. The donation primarily paid for the completion of a new 5,782-seat, $89 million ice arena to replace the undersized and aging 1,350-seat Penn State Ice Pavilion, which was deemed inadequate for long-term NCAA play. Pegula Ice Arena opened in September 2013, after the Nittany Lions played their first NCAA season in the Ice Pavilion.

In May 2011 the university hired Brandwene as the first varsity women's hockey head coach. On June 21, 2011, former Lady Icers head coach Mo Stroemel and Gina Kearns joined Brandwene's staff as assistants. Kearns had been an assistant with the Neumann University Knights, coaching there from 2009 until 2011. In September 2011, Penn State was accepted into College Hockey America for the 2012–13 season, becoming the fifth member of the conference after Wayne State abruptly ended their women's hockey program, dropping league membership to only four teams for the 2011–12 season.

NCAA

The Nittany Lions launched their NCAA era in stunning fashion, with a 5–3 victory over Vermont at Gutterson Fieldhouse on October 6, 2012, helped by a pair of goals each from Micayla Catanzariti and Shannon Yoxheimer. Behind a roster led by forward and captain Taylor Gross, forward Jenna Welch and goaltender Nicole Paniccia (each a transfer from the University of Connecticut), and featuring eight Lady Icers holdovers (including Gross) along with 17 freshmen, PSU climbed to 5–8–1 overall on November 17, 2012 with its first-ever CHA win, 3–2 over fellow former ACHA program Lindenwood. The Nittany Lions skidded the rest of the way through, managing only two wins (both against NCAA Division III Chatham University) over the final 21 games of the season, including a sweep by RIT in the first round of the CHA playoffs.

The 2013–14 season again began encouragingly, with another win at Vermont and a split in the team's first Pegula Ice Arena games, on October 18 and 19, 2013 against Union. However, despite eight ties or overtime losses and thanks largely to scoring just 1.36 times per game, the Nittany Lions regressed to four wins overall and were once again swept by RIT in the first round of the CHA playoffs.

PSU found its greatest success in the NCAA era during the 2014-15 season, when the team posted its first winning record (17-16-4), highest CHA standings position (tied for third) and first CHA playoff series win (against Lindenwood) before falling to Syracuse in the CHA semifinals, thanks largely to the Minnetonka, MN-native duo of Laura Bowman and Amy Petersen, who combined for 27 goals. One obvious season highlight was a December 2014 sweep of then-No. 6 Mercyhurst, the Nittany Lions' first and second wins against a ranked team and against the perennially-powerful Lakers. However, the team slid slightly backwards in 2015-16, matching the previous season's CHA standings placement and playoff results (a first-round sweep of RIT followed by a triple-overtime loss to Syracuse in the semifinals) but finishing only 12-19-6 overall.

2014 offseason controversy

A few weeks after the conclusion of the 2013–14 season, a group of thirteen players spoke with Penn State Associate Athletic Director Charmelle Green to "express their frustration with Brandwene and concerns about the future of the program." Seven of this group were subsequently cut from the team, including Jessica Desorcie, Darby Kern, Cara Mendelson, Brooke Meyer, Katie Murphy, Birdie Shaw and Madison Smiddy. Murphy was the most outspoken of the cuts, telling Penn State student newspaper The Daily Collegian that "[Brandwene] talked to us like we were children. Three or four weeks he would go without even looking at me or without even talking to me. He’s a bully. That’s the best word I can think of for him," and that "The girls don’t respect the coach because he hasn’t earned our respect at all. He’s been my coach for three years and I tried my hardest to respect him and I still don’t have the respect for him that I should have for a head coach because he’s not a good coach."

Over the days following Murphy's comments, others formerly involved with the program, including strength and conditioning coach Rob McLean as well as outgoing transfer players Katie Zinn and Taylor McGee also spoke critically of Brandwene.

2016 offseason controversy

The program again found itself the subject of negative headlines in March 2016, as Murphy, Mendelson, Shaw and others told or retold their stories to The Daily Collegian. One of the chief allegations concerned the handling of the 2014 complaint, with Murphy and Shaw claiming that Green promised confidentiality to the group filing the complaint before subsequently burying the issue and turning their names over to Brandwene, who cut them - actions that would appear to be in violation of Penn State athletics guidelines. Several stories of emotional abuse were included as well. One anonymous former player said that Brandwene told her to lose weight in order to play more, while Shaw recounted an incident in which Brandwene physically knocked her stick from her hands while saying "don't worry, you won't be needing that today." Shaw also said that Brandwene ruined the sport for her, to the point where she wouldn't allow her kids to play.

As with the 2014 situation, others came forward in the following days, including 2011-12 ACHA team players Katie Vaughan, Ashton Schaffer and Abbey Dufoe. Vaughan said that "it became clear to me that this man has a destructive personality and he meant the team no well-being" while recalling a conversation involving Brandwene pressing her about personal issues. Both she and Schaffer detailed other instances of emotional manipulation that almost caused them to end decade-plus playing careers, while Dufoe flatly said that "no one should be treated like that." One father of an anonymous current player said that his daughter would transfer if Brandwene is retained as coach, and that "he has heard other parents say the same thing."

2017 offseason coaching change

On April 19, 2017, Josh Brandwene retired from coaching, and on June 1, 2017, Penn State announced the hiring of longtime Princeton women's hockey head coach Jeff Kampersal to lead the Penn State women's hockey team beginning with the 2017–18 season.

Season by season results

All-time scoring leader 
 Natalie Heising, 74 (G), 63 (A), 137 (P)

Season by season goaltending leaders

(Minimum 60 minutes played)

Awards and honors
Josie Bothun, 2020–21 CHA Goaltender of the Year
Natalie Heising, 2020–21 CHA Individual Sportsmanship Award
Jeff Kampersal, 2020–21 CHA Coach of the Year
Kiara Zanon, 2020–21 CHA Rookie of the Year Award
Kiara Zanon, 2020–21 CHA Player of the Year Award
Kiara Zanon, 2020–21 Women's Hockey Commissioners Association National Rookie of the Year
Kiara Zanon, 2020–21 Second Team CCM/AHCA All-American
Kiara Zanon, 2020–21 USCHO National All-Rookie Team
Tessa Janecke, 2022–23 Women's Hockey Commissioners Association National Rookie of the Year

Season award winners

 Penn State, 2014–15 CHA Team Sportsmanship Award

Current roster
As of August 29, 2022.

See also
 Penn State Nittany Lions men's ice hockey
 Penn State Women's Ice Hockey Club
List of College women's ice hockey coaches with 250 wins

References

External links

 
W
Ice hockey teams in Pennsylvania
College Hockey America teams